Soucek Ravine is a small ravine to the west of Penney Ravine, Ardery Island, in the Windmill Islands. Discovered in 1960 by a biological field party from Wilkes Station. Named by Antarctic Names Committee of Australia (ANCA) after Dr. Zdenek Soucek, medical officer at Wilkes in 1960 and 1962.

Valleys of Antarctica
Landforms of Wilkes Land